A chamberer was a female attendant of an English queen, queen consort, or princess. There were similar positions in aristocratic households.

Chamberers at court
At court, the position was similar to a male groom of the privy chamber. The names of ten women who served Elizabeth I as chamberers are known. They were daughters of landowning gentry families. Duties could include some domestic labour, embroidery, and administration, as well as attendance on the queen. The details of the distinctions between women of the chamber and hierarchy can be obscure.

Other servants present in the royal lodging who carried out laundry work were of lower status than chamberers, and were called "lavenders". Chamberers would embroider and launder some linen items, especially ruffs. In Scotland, Elizabeth Gibb, took on this role for Anne of Denmark, the queen consort of James VI and I, in 1590, making and looking after ruffs and other garments.

Usually the queen was served by four chamberers at any one time. An Elizabethan chamberer like Elizabeth Stafford would receive an annual fee of £20 or more, and livery clothing. The chamberers of Elizabeth I received their allowances on Saint Andrew's Day. Elizabeth intervened in the marriage plans of some chamberers, and was angry at the marriage of Mary Scudamore, an indication of their status in her household.

Some chamberers, like Joan Russell and Elizabeth Marbery, continued their service as gentlewomen of the privy chamber or bed chamber, enjoying a higher status and salary. Other women present in the queen's privy chamber included the Maids of Honour, who frequently received lavish gifts of clothing, and gentlewomen in attendance who did not receive a fee or livery clothes. These gentlewomen do not appear in financial records but their names are noted in lists of those at state occasions, especially funerals.

Chamberers took part in Royal Entries and coronations, including the coronation of Mary I of England where they rode in procession and were given different clothes for the service in the Abbey.

Damsels and chamberers
In the context of household service in 15th-century England, a "damsel" was of higher or almost equivalent status to a chamberer. In Scotland, the word "chamberer" was only rarely used in the records of the court. An English commentator reported that Mary, Queen of Scots, was served by ladies, gentlewomen, and two chamberers when she was a prisoner at Lochleven Castle in 1567.

A document from 1592 concerning the household of Anne of Denmark mentions "damycelles" or damsels in her chamber. Their clothing allowance suggests they were of lower status than other attendants. Two of her servants in Scotland, Margaret Hartsyde and the aristocratic Anne Livingstone, came to her court in England after the Union of Crowns as chamberers. Hartsyde's status as a domestic servant was emphasised by her defence lawyers when she was accused of stealing the queen's jewels. 

Chamberers could enjoy substantial rewards, one Danish servant, Dorothea Silking, was granted rights to run a coal mine in Somerset. Empl;oyment of chamberers from the country of origin provided continuity of service and a cultural bridge for queens consort in the early modern period.

Chamberers to Margaret Tudor, Queen of Scots

 Francisca Baptiste (1503).
 Catherine Crow.
 Margaret Dennet
 Joanna and Margery Rutherford.

Chamberers to Catherine of Aragon
 Maria de Gavara
 Isabel de Vanegas, or Inés Vanegas, first a governess, and her daughters Inés and Teresa.
 Elizabeth Collins
 Margaret and Margery Kempe, at the Field of the Cloth of Gold
 Elizabeth Kempe
 Elizabeth Lisle.
 Anne Luke
 Blanche Marbury.
 Margaret Mulsho.
 Margaret Pennington.
 Dame Margaret Pole
 Mistress Redynge

Chamberers to Mary Tudor, Queen of France
 Elizabeth Bradshaw
 Jane Barners.
 Alice Dennis (1514)
 Anne Jerningham (1514).

Chamberers to Anne Boleyn
 Former chamberers of Catherine of Aragon

Chamberers to Catherine Howard
 Katherine Tylney

Chamberers to Katherine Parr
 Mary Odell

Chamberers to Anne of Cleves
 Anne Josselyn the elder (1539)
 Elizabeth Rastall (1539)

Chamberers to Mary I of England
 Cecily Barnes
 Edith Brediman
 Lucretia the Tumbler.
 Mary Brown.
 Jane Dormer
 Barbara Eyre
 Jane or Joan Russell.

Chamberers to Elizabeth I
 Alice Huntercombe
 Jane Bradbelt
 Elizabeth Marbery.
 Frances Newton (1559-1560)
 Nazareth Newton
 Mary Shelton (1567-1603).
 Elizabeth Stafford Drury.
 Margaret Vaughan

Chamberers to Anne of Denmark
 Margaret Hartsyde
 Anne Livingstone.
 Anna Rumler
 Dorothea Silking
 Dorothy Speckard

References

Positions within the British Royal Household
Ladies of the Privy Chamber
Chamberers at court